This is a list of television programmes broadcast by 8TV either currently broadcast or formerly broadcast on 8TV in Malaysia.

Asian Hour (Chinese drama series)
These are local drama and international drama series (mainly from China and Singapore studios) which broadcast on Weekdays from 6:00pm to 7:00pm.

2018
The Legendary Tycoon (15 March) (Drama suspended on 9 May 2018 due to special report on developments about Malaysia General Election)
I Am Not an Elite (15 May) (Drama repeated on 21 October 2020, Wednesday 11:00pm to Thursday 12:30am and Thursday 11:00pm to Friday 12:30am)
City Still Believe In Love (11 July) (previously broadcast on NTV7, broadcast by the channel as part of its new programme lineup)
 When Duty Calls / When Duty Calls (11 September)
 Sweet Combat / Sweet Combat (9 October) (Episode 1 until 12 broadcast from Monday to Thursday 9:30pm to 10:30pm, Timeslot on episode 13 onwards, Weekdays 6:00pm to 7:00pm)
 My Teacher Is a Thug / My Teacher Is A Thug (13 November)
The Grainfield (18 December)

Asian Programmes
These programmes broadcast in various timeslots, depending on the programmes type. These programmes are mainly from China, Hong Kong, South Korea includes Best of Korea Hanbok (broadcast on Thursdays and Fridays in 2015), Singapore, Hito Theatre segment, Taiwan, and Japan.

 1 Litre no Namida
 100% Senorita
 2020 JSBC Countdown Concert (29 December 2020 to 1 January 2021) (Tuesday to Friday 12:30am to 1:30am) (Reality Television)
 2021 Taichung Happy New Year (12 February 2021) (Friday 1:00pm to 3:00pm) (Reality Television)
 2021 JSBC Spring Festival Gala (20 February 2021) (Saturday 5:00pm to 7:00pm) (Reality Television)
 2022 JSBC Countdown Concert (2 February 2022 to 4 February 2022) (Wednesday 11:00pm to Thursday 1:30am), (Thursday 11:00pm to Friday 1:00am) (Reality Television)
 2022 JSBC Spring Festival Gala (2 February 2022) (Wednesday 5:00pm to 7:00pm) (Reality Television)
 2022 Happy Chinese New Year (4 February 2022 to 7 February 2022) (Friday 9:30am to Monday 10:30am) (Reality Television)
 A Date With Mei Feng 2022 CNY Special (1 February 2022 to 4 February 2022) (Tuesday 1:00pm to Friday 1:30pm) (Reality Television)
 Absolutely Charming
 Amazing World
 Amazing Magician
 Assassination Classroom (Taiwanese Mandarin dub)
 Atashinchi (Taiwanese Mandarin dub)
 Bakuman (Taiwanese Mandarin dub)
 Battle of Voices
 Beauty of China III
 Blessings / Blessings
 Bewitched in Tokyo
 Beyond Show (China Talent Show) (Repeated on 23 October 2021, Saturday 11:00pm to Sunday 12:30am) (Reality Television - Talent Search Competition Show)
 The Birth of Performer (Reality Television - Acting Talent Search Competition Show)
 A Bite of China
 Blue Exorcist: Kyoto Saga (Taiwanese Mandarin dub)
 Body SOS (previous seasons from NTV7)
 Body SOS Season 9 (13 November 2021) (Saturday 6:30pm to 7:00pm) (Reality Television)
 The Brain (previous seasons from NTV7)
 Buzzer Beat
 C.L.I.F.
Canton Flavor (Season 6) (27 March 2022) (Sunday 9:00pm to 10:00pm) (Reality Television)
 Chef Nic
 Chibi Maruko Chan (Taiwanese Mandarin dub)
 China Exploration
 China Idioms Competition
 China Mega Projects
 China Star
 Chinese Paladin
 Chinese Hero Zhao Zi Long
 Chuan Mei Tou Shi
 Code Blue
 Corner with Love
 Cruel Romance
 Culture Japan
 A Date with Luyu
 Destined Love
 Detective Conan (Taiwanese Mandarin dub)
 Ding Ge Long Dong Qiang
 Discover The Silk Road II
 Doctor
 Don't Worry Be Happy
 Double Happiness
 The Dream Catchers
 The Dream Makers (repeat of NTV7 programme)
 A Dream Named Desire
 Dream of China
 Divorce Lawyers (repeat of NTV7 programme)
 Eight Heroes
 The Enchanted
 Eureka Moment China
 Fairy Tail (Taiwanese Mandarin dub)
 Family Humour Contest
 Feel The World (1 April 2022) (Friday 9:30pm to 10:30pm) (Reality Television - Travel Show)
 Feng Shu's Cooking Class
 Flowers of Reluctance
 Foods in life
 Garo
 Ghost Catcher Zhong Kui (24 June 2021) (Weekdays 9:30am to 10:30am) (Drama repeated on 16 September 2021) (Wednesday 11:00 pm to Thursday 12:30 am and Thursday 11:00 pm to Friday 12:30 am) (Taiwanese Mandarin dub) (1995-1996 Taiwan version)
 Go Fighting! / Go Fighting! 2020 (26 September 2020) (Saturday 9:00pm to 11:00pm) (Multiple Seasons - Season 1 from 2 January 2016, Season 2 from 8 October 2016, Season 3 from 4 November 2017, Season 6 from 26 September 2020) (Season 6 - Repeat broadcast on 17 May 2021, Monday 12:00am to 1:30am) (Season 6 repeat broadcast - Timeslot on 6 June onwards, Sunday 10:30pm to Monday 12:00am) (Reality Television)
Go Fighting! Treasure Tour Season 2 (28 August 2021) Saturday 9:30pm to 11:30pm) (Reality Television) (Repeat broadcast on 7 March 2022, Monday 12:00am to 2:00am)
 Ge Tai Sing Competition
 Genius Go Go Go / Genius Go Go Go (6 November 2021) (Saturday 9:00pm to 11:00pm) (Timeslot on 27 November 2021 onwards, Saturday 10:00pm to Sunday 12:00am) (Multiple Seasons) (Reality Television)
 Genius Go Go Go CNY Special 2021 / Genius Go Go Go CNY Special (14 February 2021) (Sunday 1:00pm to 3:00pm) (Reality Television) (Festive: Chinese New Year Special Programme)
 The Good Old Days
 The Grand Mansion Gate
 Guess (Reality Television)
Guess Guess Guess (Weekends 12:30am to 2:00am) (Reality Television)
 Guinness Night Show China
 Gujian Qitan
 Happy Camp
 Sing Again, Hera Gu (26 March 2015)
 Holland V
 Hot Shot
Hottest and Craziest (Reality Television)
 Hottest and Craziest CNY Special 2021 (27 January 2022) (Thursday 10:00pm to 11:00pm) (Reality Television)
 Hungry!
 Hunter X Hunter (1999) (Taiwanese Mandarin dub)
Hunter X Hunter (2011) (Taiwanese Mandarin dub)
 Huo Yuanjia
 Hurry Up, Brother
 I am a Singer (Reality Television - Sing Competition Show)
 I Am the Actor (Reality Television - Acting Talent Search Competition Show)
 I Can See Your Voice (South Korean TV series)#Season 6 / I Can See Your Voice (South Korean Edition)#Season 6 (15 August 2020) (Saturday 5:30pm to 7:00pm) (Reality Television)
 If You Are the One (repeat of NTV7 programme)
 Impossible challenge (season 1 onwards)
 The In-Laws
 In the Name of Love
 In The Realm of Success
 Into the Sun
 Journey of the Fortune God
 The Journey: A Voyage
 The Journey: Tumultuous Times (repeat of NTV7 programme) 
 Keep Running (TV series)/ Keep Running (Reality Television)
 Keep Running (TV series)#First season / Keep Running Season One (26 October 2018) (Friday 9:30pm to 11:30pm) (Reality Television)
 Keep Running (TV series)#Second season / Keep Running Season Two (14 February 2020 until 7 March 2020 - Friday 9:30pm to 11:30pm) (8 August 2020 - Saturday 9:00pm to 11:00pm) (Reality Television)
 Keep Running (TV series)#Third season / Keep Running Season Three (27 March 2021) (Saturday 9:00pm to 11:00pm) (Reality Television) (Timeslot on 5 June onwards, Saturday 9:30pm to 11:30pm)
 Keep Running (TV series)#Fourth season / Keep Running Season Four (15 August 2021) (Sunday 9:00pm to 11:00pm) (Reality Television) (7 episodes) (Broadcast suspended on 29 August 2021 for chinese movies) (Repeated broadcast on 1 October 2021) (Friday 9:30pm to 11:30pm) (10 episodes) (Timeslot on 5 November 2021 onwards, Friday 10:30pm to 11:30pm)
 Kekkaishi
 A Kindred Spirit
 Kinship
 King of the show (repeat of ntv7 drama)
 Lavender
 The Law of Ueki
 Legend of the Heavenly Sword and Golden Sabre
 Legend of Nezha
 The Legend of Swordsman
 The Legend of Zhong Kui
 Lego Monkie Kid (also aired on TV3 and NTV7) (8 November 2020) (Sunday 5:00pm to 5:30pm)
 Lego Monkie Kid (Movie) (1 November 2020)
 Let's Go! Dream Team
 Lotus Lantern
 Love and Brotherhood
 Love Concierge
 Love Journey
 Love Keeps Going
 Love SOS
 Lunch no Joō
 M! Countdown
 Magi: The Labyrinth of Magic (Taiwanese Mandarin dub)
 Mamma Mia (repeat of NTV7 programme)
 Meteor Garden
 A Million Dollar Dream 
 Mimic King
 Mind Matters
 Mr Con and Ms CSI
Mr. Player (7 August 2020) (Friday 9:00pm to 11:00pm) (Multiple Seasons - Season 6 in 2019, Season 7 in 2020) (Reality Television) (Timeslot on 2 July onwards, Friday 10:00pm to Saturday 12:00am)
 My Husband (2003)
 My Little Bride
 My Lucky Star
 My MVP Valentine
 My Sunshine
 Mystery in the Palace
The Negotiator (Reality Television)
 The Negotiator Season 1 (22 August 2017) (Tuesday 10:45pm to Wednesday 12:45am) (Reality Television)
 The Negotiator Season 3 (2 February 2018) (Friday 9:30pm to 11:30pm) (Reality Television) [(Timeslot on 2 March - 9:30pm to 12:00pm, 3 March - 8:30pm to 11:00pm, 9 March - 9:30pm to 11:30pm, 10 March - 8:30pm to 10:30pm, 16 March - 9:30pm to 11:30pm, 17 March - 8:30pm to 10:30pm)] (Shows broadcast on the same day as China)
 The Negotiator Season 4 (15 February 2019) (Friday 9:30pm to 11:30pm) (Reality Television)
 The Negotiator Season 5 (1 March 2021) (Sunday 9:30pm to 11:30pm) (Reality Television) (Timeslot on 8 March onwards, Sunday 8:30pm to 10:30pm)
 New Journey to the West 7 / New Journey to the West 7 (14 November 2020) (Saturday 5:00pm to 7:00pm) (Reality Television)
 Noble Aspirations
 Novoland: The Castle in the Sky
 Ode to Joy Season One / Ode to Joy 1 (8 July 2017) (Weekends 10:00am to 12:00pm) (repeat of NTV7 programme)
 Ode to Joy Season Two / Ode to Joy 2 (6 August 2020) (Weekdays 6:00pm to 6:58pm) (repeat of NTV7 programme)
 Palace
 Perfect Match / If You Are the One (2019 edition) (1 February 2020) (Saturday 5:30pm to 7:00pm) (Repeat broadcast on 8 May 2021, Saturday 11:00pm to Sunday 12:30am) (Timeslot on 5 June 2021 onwards, Saturday 11:30pm to Sunday 1:00am) (Reality Television)
 Pick Me for a Spring Festival Gala
 Pilgrimage of Wealth 2
 Pinocchio
 Precious Youth
 Pretty Li Hui Zhen (repeat of NTV7 programme)
 Primary Tea House
 Prince Hours
 The Best Things in my life
 The Prince Who Turns into a Frog
 Princess Meili
Produce Camp 2020 (29 May 2020) (Friday and Saturday 9:00pm to 11:00pm) (Broadcast time for 29 May and 5 June: 9:30pm to 12:30pm) (Reality Television - Talent Search Competition Show)
 Produce X 101 / Produce X 101 (16 June 2019) (Reality Television - Talent Search Competition Show)
 The Proud Twins
 Ranma ½ (Taiwanese Mandarin dub)
 Reborn! (Taiwanese Mandarin dub)
 Road to Kingdom / Road to Kingdom (27 February 2021) (Saturday 5:30pm to 7:00pm) (Reality Television)
 Rolling Love
 Roof of the World
 Roseate-Love
 Rose in the wind
 Royal Romance
 Run for Money Tosochuu
 Saiyuki (2000) (Taiwanese Mandarin dub)
 Saiyuki (2006)
 Shake It Up (14 September 2020) (Saturday 8:30pm to 10:00pm) (Reality Television - Dance Talent Search Competition Show)
 Sidewalk Scientist
 Sing My Song
 Smiling Pasta
 Super Diva Season 6 (12 May 2019) (Sunday 5:00pm to 6:30pm) (Reality Television - Talent Search Competition Show)
 Super Diva Season 7 (18 April 2020) (Saturday 11:00pm to Sunday 1:00am) (Reality Television - Talent Search Competition Show) (Season 7 - Repeat broadcast on 22 May 2021, Saturday 5:30pm to 7:00pm) 
 Super Idol
 Super Trio series
 Super Trio Maximus
 Stay Healthy, Be Happy: Bie Rang Shen Ti Bu Kai Xin
 Star avenue
 Star Awards 2021 (31 January 2022) (Monday 5:00pm to 7:30pm) (Reality Television - Actor/Actress Awards Show)
 Successor of Chinese Culture Image
 Super boys
 Reply 1997
 Surgeon Bong Dal-hee
Taiwan Ah Cheng
 Taiwan Food Delights
 Telling Maria
The Adventure of the Young (Season 2) (20 November 2020) (Friday 9:00pm to 10:45pm) (Repeated on 14 August 2021, Sunday 1:00am to 2:30am) (Reality Television)
The Flash Band (7 January 2022) (Friday 10:00pm to 11:30pm) (Reality Television - Group Sing Competition Show)
 The Magical Needle
 The Next: Tian Lai Zhi Zhan
 The Shining Star
The Treasured Voice 3 (2 April 2022) (Saturday 9:00pm to 11:00pm) (Timeslot on 23 April 2022 onwards, Saturday 9:30pm to 11:30pm) (Reality Television - Sing Competition Show)
 The Ultimatum
The Voice From Heaven (Season 1) (16 February 2020) (Sunday 8:30pm to 10:30pm) (Season 1 - Repeated on 23 May 2021, Sunday 3:00pm to 5:00pm) (Reality Television - Sing Competition Show)
 Toyama Japan, How Delicious (31 January 2021) (Sunday 5:00pm to 6:00pm) (Reality Television) (Exact broadcast start date: Unconfirmed)
 TVB 52nd Anniversary Gala / TVB Anniversary Gala Show (12 February 2021) (Friday 5:00pm to 7:00pm) (Reality Television - Actor/Actress Awards Show) (Repeat broadcast on 20 February 2021) (Saturday 3:00pm to 5:00pm) (Repeat broadcast on 13 November 2021) (Saturday 3:00pm to 5:00pm)
 TVB 53rd Anniversary Gala / TVB Anniversary Gala Show (1 February 2022) (Tuesday 5:00pm to 7:00pm) (Reality Television - Actor/Actress Awards Show)
 Twenty four hours
 Ultimate Variety Show
 Unveil The Truth
 Variety Big Brother
 Viva Le Famille
 Sing! China / Sing!China (formerly known as The Voice of China) (16 July 2016) (Saturday 8:30pm to 10:30pm) (Multiple Seasons - Season 1 from 16 July 2016, Season 2 from 14 July 2017, Season 3 from 13 July 2018, Season 4 from 19 July 2019) (Reality Television - Sing Talent Search Competition Show)
Sing! China 2019 (Season 4) (19 July 2019) (Friday 9:30pm to 11:30pm) (Reality Television - Sing Talent Search Competition Show)
 Wanted: Son-In Law
 We Fall in Love
 Where Are We Going, Dad?
 Who Are You?
 Winter Sonata
 Wok of Life
 Women of Times
 Wonderful Life
 X-Space II
 Ying Ye 3 Jia 1
 Yong Chun
 You Can Be An Angel Too
Young Forever Season 2 (19 December 2020) (Saturday 9:00pm to 10:40pm) (Reality Television - Group Sing Competition) (Repeat broadcast on 22 August 2021, Sunday 11:00pm to Monday 12:30am) (Repeat broadcast on 30 April 2022, Saturday 11:30pm to Sunday 1:00am)
 Yours Fatefully
 Youth and Melody (19 June 2021) (Saturday 9:30pm to 11:30pm) (Repeated on 16 January 2022, 12:00am to 1:30am)  (Reality Television - Group Sing Competition)
 Yummy Show

2014
 Empress Ki / Empress Ki (26 June) (Weekdays 5:00pm to 6:00pm)
 For You In Full Blossom (13 December) (Saturday 10:30am to 12:30pm)

2015
 Misaeng (8 January) (Thursday to Friday 10:30pm to 12:00am)
 Alice in Cheongdam-dong / Cheongdam-dong Scandal (7 March) (Saturday 10:30am to 12:30pm)
 Sing Again, Hera Gu (26 March) (Thursday to Friday 10:30pm to 12:00am)
 Potato Star 2013QR3 (Approximate date: 29 March) From 29 March to 21 June (Sunday 4:30pm to 6:00pm) From 27 June to October 3 (Saturday 4:00pm to 5:30pm)

2016
Perfect Couple (6 April) (Weekdays 5:00pm to 6:00pm)
 Diamond Lover / Diamond Lover (8 June) (Weekdays 5:00pm to 6:00pm)

2018
Great Expectations (23 November) (Friday 10:30pm to 12:30am)
 Sweet Dreams / Sweet Dreams (23 December) (Sunday 3:00pm to 5:00pm) (2 episodes back to back) (Drama suspended on 17 February 2019)

Weekdays 6:00pm to 7:00pm drama:

2007
 Unique Flavor / Unique Flavor (Exact date and month: Unknown)

2008
Love and Affection (25 April)
 Love Above All / Love In The Vineyard (24 September 2008 to 12 February 2010)

2010
 My Family My Love / Parent's Love (18 February 2010 to 28 June 2011)

2011
2012
2013
2014
 Lee's Family Reunion / Lee's Family Reunion (29 June 2011 to 20 February 2014)

2014
2015
 The Heart of Woman / The Heart of Women (21 February 2014 to 27 December 2016)

2016
Stepmother's Spring (28 December)

2017
First Love (24 February)
 The Empress of China / The Empress of China (21 April)
 The Journey of Flower / The Journey of Flower (4 August)
The Adoption (16 October)
 Legend of Dragon Pearl / Legend of the Dragon Pearl (14 December) (Drama suspended on 15 February 2018 and 16 February 2018)

Best Of Hokkien (Series imported from Taiwan)
These Hokkien-language programmes are made by Taiwan studios that are mostly edited to fit in the one-hour period of the broadcast channel. There are six different timeslots for these segments: 11:30am to 12:30pm, 1:00 to 2:00pm, 4:00pm to 5:00pm (formerly on 20 April 2018), and 6:00pm to 7:00pm (formerly on 24 September 2008) from Weekdays, 2:00pm to 3:00pm and 3:00pm to 4:00pm on Weekends. 
For Weekdays Taiwan drama segments, there are 2 timeslots, which are 1:00pm to 2:00pm (since 31 December 2018) and 3:30pm to 4:30pm (since 2 January 2019) from Weekdays.

Note: Timeslots are affected by the Chinese Midday News from 12:30pm to 1:00pm for shows in between 11:30am to 2:00pm.

 Please do not edit this section temporarily as the drama series here are in a mess and requires a proper subsection based on their respective debut broadcast time, day of broadcast (e.g.: Weekday/Weekends). Only edit this when you are able to help sort them out to their respective subsection.

 Ma Zu & Guan Yin (Repeated on 13 April 2021) (Weekdays 9:30am to 10:30am)
 Shun Niang

2011
The Amazing Strategist Liu Bowen (22 January) (Weekdays 11:30am to 12:30pm and 1:00pm to 2:00pm)
 The Spirit of Love / Love (27 June) (Weekdays 11:30am to 12:30pm and 1:00pm to 2:00pm)

2013
 Mom's House / A Place Called Home (2 January) (11:30am to 12:30pm and 1:00pm to 2:00pm)

2014
Legend of Taiwan (Multiple Seasons) (2014) (Weekends 2:00pm to 3:00pm)

2015
 Night Market Life / Night Market Life (1 January 2015) (Weekdays 11:30am to 12:30pm and 1:00pm to 2:00pm) 
 Taiwan Tornado / Taiwan Tornado (Approximate date: 9 June) (Previously broadcast on NTV7 channel on 20 April 2011 (11:30am to 12:30pm and 1:00pm to 2:00pm)

2016
 Haru (TV series) / Chun Mei – Haru (16 December 2016) (Weekdays 11:30am to 12:30pm and 1:00pm to 2:00pm)

2017
If God Loves (24 January) (Weekdays 11:30am to 12:30pm and 1:00pm to 2:00pm) (Timeslot on 27 March 2017 onwards, Weekdays 11:30am to 12:30pm)
Dragon Dance (21 June) (Weekdays 1:00pm to 2:00pm)

2018
Life of Pearl (20 April) (Weekdays 5:00pm to 6:00pm) (Timeslot on 4 June 2018 onwards, Weekdays 4:00pm to 5:00pm)
100% Wife (7 June) (Drama suspended on 31 August 2018, 25 October 2018, 25 December 2018, 31 December 2018) (Drama suspended on 4 February 2019 until 7 February 2019, 11 October 2019, 25 December 2019) (Weekdays 4:00pm to 5:00pm) (Timeslot on 2 January 2019 onwards, Weekdays 3:30pm to 4:30pm)
The King of Drama (4 October) (Weekdays 1:00pm to 2:00pm) 
My Sister (31 December) (Weekdays 1:00pm to 2:00pm)

2019
An Adopted Daughter (18 February) (Weekdays 1:00pm to 2:00pm)
Sun After The Rain (21 March) (Weekdays 1:00pm to 2:00pm)
Flavor of Life (10 April) (Weekdays 11:30am to 12:30pm)
Once Upon a Time in Beitou (11 July) (Weekdays 1:00pm to 2:00pm) (Drama repeated on 12 August 2020, Weekdays 9:30am to 10:30am)
Father's Wish (29 August) (Weekdays 1:00pm to 2:00pm) (Drama repeated on 1 October 2020, Weekdays 9:30am to 10:30am)
Beautiful Makeover (31 October) (Weekdays 1:00pm to 2:00pm) (Drama suspended on 24 January 2020, 27 January 2020)
The Making of an Ordinary Woman (21 December) (Weekends 3:00pm to 4:00pm) (Drama repeated on 5 July 2021, Weekends 5:00pm to 6:00pm)

2020
The Love Story in Banana Orchard (29 January) (Weekdays 3:30pm to 4:30pm) (Drama repeated on 19 April 2021, Weekdays 1:00pm to 2:00pm) (Drama repeated on 19 April 2022, Weekdays 9:45am to 10:35am)
The Sound Of Happiness (16 March) (Weekdays 3:30pm to 5:30pm) (2 episodes back to back) (Only 1 episode broadcast instead of 2 on 16 March) (Only 1 episode broadcast instead of 2 on 15 April 2020 and 22 April 2020) (Drama suspended on 6 November 2020, 11 February 2021,  12 February 2021)

2021
 Legend of Taiwan Season 13 / Legend of Taiwan (31 July) (Weekends 2:00pm to 3:00pm) (Repeated on 24 January 2022) (Weekdays 10:30am to 11:30am) (Timeslot change from 8 April 2022 onwards, 9:45am to 10:30am)
In the Name of Love (22 September) (Weekdays 3:30pm to 5:30pm) (2 episodes back to back)

2022
Born Into Loving Hands (3 January) (Weekdays 3:30pm to 5:30pm) (2 episodes back to back) (Timeslot for first episode on 3 January 2022 from 4:30pm to 5:30pm) (Drama suspended on 31 January until 4 February)
 Legend of Taiwan Season 14 / Legend of Taiwan (29 January) (Weekends 2:00pm to 3:00pm)
Great Times (6 May) (2 episodes back to back)

Best Of Local
These programmes are locally produced Chinese programmes and former programmes in English and Malay. These programmes are broadcast in various timeslots.

 5 Jingga
 8 Chart Show
 8 Corners
 8TV 18th Anniversary Bonanza (Sponsored by Abbott Laboratories - Ensure Malaysia - Ensure Gold) (Reality Television) (Repeat broadcast on 15 January 2022)
 8 E-Channel (formerly known as 8 E-News)
 8 Mini Century
 8 Style
 Alert
 Alice in Wonderland (repeat of NTV7 drama)
 Amusing Race
 Away from Home (repeat of NTV7 drama)
 A New Journey (February 2021)
 A beautiful world (repeat of NTV7 drama)
 Behind The Scam
 Best In The World
 The Best of Latte
 Blogger Boy
 Brilliant Mind
 CJ Wow Shop
 Celebrity Chat
 China Star
 Crime Scene
 Da Funki Monkee
 Destinasi Bajet (Reality Television - Travel Show)
 Discover Smiles Zoom Malaysia
 Double Triple or Nothing
 Double Triple or Nothing Kidsgirls
 Durian, Kaya, Teh Tarik (Season Two) (2020) (Reality Television - Game Show)
 Eve's Diary (2013)
 Eyes on You
 Famous Chinese Cuisine
 Fantasia: A Modern Fairy Tale
 Folks and Tales
 Footprints in history
 G-Thang
 Ghost
 Go-Go-Go
 Go Travel (Reality Television - Travel Show)
 The Gossip World
 Hey Morning
 Hip Hoppin Asia
 Ho Chak! (Reality Television)
 Ho Chak! Japan (2017)
 Hot Chef 
 Hot FM AM KREW
 I am not a loser (repeat of NTV7 drama)
 I Dare You!
 I Wanna Be A Model (Reality Television - Modelling Talent Search Competition Show)
 Identity Switched (repeat of NTV7 drama)
 In-Laws 2 (repeat of NTV7 drama)
 Journey To Royal Cuisine
 Kan-Cheong Kitchen (Reality Television - Cooking Competition Show)
 King of Dessert
 KL Lights
 Latte @ 8
 Let's Cycle
 Let's Cycle (Season Two) (Repeat broadcast on 8 September 2021)
 Let's Cycle (Season Three) (Repeat broadcast on 8 December 2021)
 Love in Seoul
 Majalah 3: All Covid-19 Specials Series (Mandarin Subtitled) (Reality Television - Documentary)
 Malaysian Idol (Reality Television - Sing Talent Search Competition Show)
 Malaysia's Most Beautiful
 The Memoir Of Majie (Repeat of NTV7 drama)
 Memories Puzzle (Repeat broadcast on 23 August 2021) (Reality Television)
 Midday Mandarin News
 Mission I'm Possible
 Money Matters (Season Three) (Reality Television) (Repeat broadcast on 23 August 2021)
 Move It!
 Nescafé Kick-Start
 A New Journey
 Next Miss Universe Malaysia
 Now Everyone Can Fly To Australia
 Ohayo
 On The Brink (repeat of NTV7 drama)
 One in a Million (2006-2009) (Reality Television - Sing Talent Search Competition Show)
 Oppa! Oppa! (repeat of NTV7 drama)
 Part Of The Game
 Perfect Match
 Persona (repeat of NTV7 drama)
 Please Give Me a Job!
 Project Runway Malaysia (Reality Television - Fashion Design Talent Search Competition Show)
 Project Superstar (Reality Television - Sing Talent Search Competition Show)
 Pulse of life (repeat of NTV7 drama)
 Punch and Jude
 Realiti
 Reel Review
 Revolving Heart (repeat of NTV7 drama)
 Secret of Success
 So You Think You Can Dance (Reality Television - Dance Talent Search Competition Show)
 Spec-Ops
 Star Avenue (repeat of NTV7 drama)
 Step Forward
 Summer Live Concert 
 Summer Brothers (repeat of NTV7 drama)
 Superhero at home (repeat of NTV7 drama)
 Taste of Malaysia: Martin Yan (Chinese) (Reality Television - Cooking Show)
 Taste of Chinese New Year
 Taste of life
 Teman
 The Injustice Stranger (repeat of NTV7 drama)
 The Liar (repeat of NTV7 drama)
 The Precedents (repeat of NTV7 drama)
 The Pulse Of Life (repeat of NTV7 drama)
 The Turning Point (repeat of NTV7 drama)
 The Undercover (repeat of NTV7 drama)
 Total Europe Explore
 Top Student (2019) (Reality Television)
 Treasure Hunt in Malaysia
 Trippin
 Twenty Hundred
 The Ultimate Power Group
 The Ultimate Power Song
 The Ultimate Power Star
 The Ultimate Prom Nite
 Unchained Fate
 Unveil The Truth
 Upin & Ipin (Singapore Mandarin dub)
 We Are One Malaysia
 Welcome to the Rail World
 Welcome to the Rail World Japan
 Without Boundaries
 Wow Shop (Formerly known as CJ Wow Shop)  (1 November 2020) (Daily) (Reality Television - Teleshopping/Shopping channels)
 The Z Power (2019) (Sponsored by Massimo and V soy) (Reality Television)

2006
 Gol & Gincu The Series#Season 1 (4 June)

2007
 Sky (6 May)
 Gol & Gincu The Series#Season 2 (8 July)

2008
Goodnight DJ Season 1 (6 January) (Repeat broadcast on 16 August 2021) (Timeslot on 23 August 2021 onwards) 
 Step of Dance (6 July)
 Alam's Story (3 August)
 Love Is Not Blind (23 November)

2009
 A Cup of Love (5 July)
 Cheer 2009 (24 July) (Friday 9:30pm onwards) (Reality Television - Cheerleading Documentary Show)
The Adjusters (25 October) (Repeat broadcast on 15 November 2021)

2010
 My Secret Chef (29 August)
Goodnight DJ Season 2 (17 October) (Repeat broadcast on 27 September 2021)

2011
The Adjusters 2 (2 October)
 Model A la Mode (8 December)

2012
 The Beat (18 November)

2013
 Dive into Love (3 March) (Repeat broadcast on 7 June 2021)
 What If (5 June)
 Justice Bao Jr. (17 August)
 Mr. Bun (1 December)

2014
 3.15 AM (3 August)

2015
 The Stalker (10 December)

2016
 I Wanna Sing (9 October) (Sunday 8:30pm onwards) (Reality Television - Sing Talent Search Competition Show)

2017
I Can See Your Voice Malaysia Mandarin Season 1 (20 August 2017) (Reality Television)
 Growth Behind The Sun (6 October) (Repeat on 7 August 2020)
 Beautiful World - My Pet Lover (5 November) (Drama repeated on 19 September 2021) (Local drama series)

2018
Singing in the Spring (5 February) (Local drama series) (Drama repeated on 2 January 2022) (2 episodes back to back)
I Can See Your Voice Malaysia Season 2 (19 August) (Repeat broadcast on 7 November 2021) (Reality Television)

2019
 Durian, Kaya, Teh Tarik (24 February) (Reality Television - Game Show)
 Behind The Scam (Season 2) (10 November) (Repeat broadcast on 3 October 2020) (10 episodes) (Repeat broadcast on 24 June 2021) (3 episodes) (Repeat broadcast on 2 October 2021) (4 episodes)

2020
 Family Singing Show (2 August) (Sponsored by Ebene) (Reality Television - Family Singing Competition Show)
 The Z Power 2020 (11 October) (Sponsored by GlaxoSmithKline - Scott's DHA Gummies) (Reality Television)
 Top Student 2020 (20 December) (Reality Television)

2021
 Fortune Special 2021 (31 January) (Reality Television - Festive: Chinese New Year Seasonal Fortune Telling Show)
 Family Singing Show CNY Special (12 February) (Reality Television) (Festive: Chinese New Year Singing Show)
Bonus Vacation (13 February)
 The Z Power Special (11 April, 18 April) (Reality Television)
 Durian, Kaya, Teh Tarik (Season Three) (18 April) (Reality Television - Game Show)
 Ho Chak! 2021/Ho Chak! Eat Live Well (18 April) (Show resume on 7 November 2021) (Reality Television) (Repeat broadcast on 12 November 2021)
 Taste of Memory (5 June) (Reality Television) (Repeat broadcast on 24 July 2021) (Repeat broadcast on 6 February 2022)
 Family Singing Show Season 2 (6 June)  (Sponsored by Ginvera) (Reality Television - Family Singing Competition Show)
 A New Journey (Season 8) (11 June) (Reality Television) (Repeat broadcast on 21 June 2021)
 ACCCIM Centennial History Documentary (25 June) (Reality Television)
 Celebrities Living REC (2 July) (Reality Television) (Repeat broadcast on 2 October 2021) (2 episodes back to back)
 Family Health (11 July) (Reality Television) (Repeat broadcast on 15 July 2021)
 Back to the Foodture (8 August) (Reality Television)
 Click to Health (10 October) (Reality Television) (Repeat broadcast on 14 October 2021)
 The Elite Talk (5 November) (Reality Television)
Love At First Song (7 November) (Sponsored by Cuckoo Malaysia - Wonderdewi by Wonderlab) (Reality Television - Couple Search Singing Talent Competition Show)
 Girls Day Out (26 November) (Reality Television) (Repeat broadcast on 29 November 2021), (Repeat broadcast on 26 March 2022)
 Shila Amzah Masterclass (27 November) (Broadcast suspended on 8 January) (Broadcast resumed on 15 January) (Sponsored by Duopharma - Flavettes Effervescent H-Drate) (Reality Television - Singing Competition Show)

2022
 Majalah 3: The Cries for Help of Klang Valley (2 January) (Mandarin Subtitled) (Reality Television - Documentary)
 8 E-News Mini Concert (8 January)
 Fortune Special 2022 (9 January) (Reality Television - Festive: Chinese New Year Seasonal Fortune Telling Show) (Repeat broadcast on 24 January, 25 January, 31 January and 8 February 2022)
 Cook Vs Chef (16 January) (Sponsored by Panasonic Malaysia - Panasonic Cooking) (Reality Television - Cooking Competition Show)
 Ho Chak! CNY Special 2022 (30 January) (Repeat broadcast on 2 February 2022)
 A New Journey CNY Special 2022 (31 January) (Reality Television) (Repeat broadcast on 2 February 2022)
 Durian, Kaya, Teh Tarik CNY Special 2022 (1 February, 2 February), (Repeat broadcast on 4 February 2022, 5 February 2022)
 Yoohoo 2022 (1 February) (Reality Television)
 Anticipating the World (Sponsored by S P Setia) (3 February)
 King Of Travelogue (11 February) (Reality Television - Travel Show) (Repeat broadcast on 15 February 2022)
 Durian, Kaya, Teh Tarik (Season Four) (13 February) (Reality Television - Game Show)
 Ho Chak! 2022/Ho Chak! Food Transformer (3 April) (Sponsored by Ginvera) (Reality Television) (Repeat broadcast on 8 April 2022)
 Journey To Homeland (23 April) (Saturday 9:00pm to 9:30pm) (Reality Television - Travel Show)
 Dream It! Do It! (8 May) (Sunday 6:00pm onwards) (Reality Television)
 I Am The Show (8 May) (Sunday 9:00pm onwards) (Reality Television - Acting Talent Search Competition Show)

Best Of TVB (Series imported from Hong Kong)
These series are produced by Hong Kong's Television Broadcasts Ltd. Sometimes the timeslot may be replaced by a Chinese TV series (Asian Hour) or a non-TVB Cantonese TV series as an interim. The timeslot is set at 7:00pm to 8:00pm from Monday to Friday.

 Beyond the Realm of Conscience
 Burning Flame III
 Catch Me Now
 Devil's Disciples
 Dicey Business
 D.I.E.
 The Four
 Glittering Days
 A Great Way to Care
 Heart of Greed
 A Journey Called Life
 Land of Wealth
 Last One Standing
 Legend of the Demigods
 Heart of Greed 2
 Rosy Business
 The Silver Chamber of Sorrows
 Survivor's Law II
 To Grow with Love
 The Ultimate Crime Fighter
 Wars of In-Laws II

2010
Ghost Catcher, Legend of Beauty (Zhongkui) (15 November)

2011
 D.I.E. Again (19 December)

2012
 A Chip Off the Old Block (26 January)
 Mysteries of Love (24 February)
 A Fistful of Stances (30 March)
 In the Eye of the Beholder (4 May)
 Beauty Of The Game (20 July)
 Can't Buy Me Love (17 August)
 Every Move You Make (3 October)
 When Lanes Merge (31 October)
 No Regrets (28 November)

2013
 Beauty Knows No Pain (11 January)
 Ghetto Justice (8 February)
 The Rippling Blossom (12 March)
 Grace Under Fire(9 April)
 Twilight Investigation (23 May)
 Yes, Sir. Sorry, Sir! (20 June)
 Curse of the Royal Harem(27 September)
 Bottled Passion (11 November)
 The Life and Times of a Sentinel (10 December)

2014
 L'Escargot (15 January)
 Ghetto Justice II (28 February)
 Queens of Diamonds and Hearts (31 March)
 The Hippocratic Crush (5 May)
 Witness Insecurity / Witness Insecurity (10 June)
 The Demi-Gods and Semi-Devils / The Demi-Gods and Semi-Devils (7 August)
 Silver Spoon, Sterling Shackles / Silver Spoon, Sterling Shackles (22 September)
 House of Harmony and Vengeance (17 November)
 Divas in Distress (29 December)

2015
 King Maker (28 January)
 A Great Way to Care II (12 March)
 A Change of Heart (16 April)
 The Hippocratic Crush II (23 July)
 Will Power (3 September)
 Brother's Keeper (19 October)
 Return of the Silver Tongue (2 December)

2016
 Gilded Chopsticks (6 January)
 Ghost Dragon of Cold Mountain (15 February)
 Overachievers (28 March)
 All That Is Bitter Is Sweet (9 May)
 The Ultimate Addiction (6 September)
 Officer Geomancer (18 October)
 Noblesse Oblige (15 November)
 Lady Sour (14 December)

2017
 Eye in the Sky (11 January)
 Smooth Talker (10 February)
 Wudang Rules (10 March)
 Ghost of Relativity (23 June)
 Under the Veil (2 August)
 With or Without You (30 August)
 Captain of Destiny (11 October)
 Short End of the Stick (24 November)

2018
 Fashion War (12 January)
 K9 Cop (9 February)
 Over Run Over (13 March)
 Fire of Eternal Love / Fire of Eternal Love (12 April) (Drama repeated on 22 July 2020, Wednesday 11:00pm to Thursday 12:30am and Thursday 11:00pm to Friday 12:30am)
 The Last Healer in Forbidden City / The Last Healer In Forbidden City (26 June)
 House of Spirits / House of Spirits (24 July)
The Great Adventurer Wesley (5 September)
 Brother's Keeper II / Brother's Keeper II (25 October)
 A Fist Within Four Walls / A Fist Within Four Walls (19 December)

2019
 Burning Hands / Burning Hands (28 January)
 Provocateur / Provocateur (12 March)
 A General, a Scholar and a Eunuch / A General, A Scholar and A Eunuch (16 April)
 My Unfair Lady / My Unfair Lady (30 May)
 The Exorcist's Meter / The Exorcist's Meter (9 July)
 The Unholy Alliance (TV series) / The Unholy Alliance (6 August)
 Story of Yanxi Palace / Story of Yanxi Palace (16 September) (Drama repeated on 4 January 2020 and 21 October 2020)
The Forgotten Valley (23 December)

2020
 Deep in the Realm of Conscience / Deep In The Realm Of Conscience (20 January)
 Another Era / Another Era (12 March)
The Ghetto-Fabulous Lady (1 May)
 Barrack O'Karma / Barrack O'karma (5 June) (Drama repeated on 10 February 2021, Weekdays 1:00pm to 2:00pm)
 Eternal Love of Dream / Eternal Love, The Pillow Book (3 July) (Drama repeated on 22 June 2021, Monday 11:00pm to Tuesday 12:30am and Tuesday 11:00pm to Wednesday 12:30am) (Timeslot for first episode on 22 June 2021 from 11:50pm to 12:30am)
Wonder Women (21 September) (Drama repeated on 15 March 2021, Weekdays 1:00pm to 2:00pm)
Reunion: The Sound of the Providence (26 October) (Drama repeated on 12 August 2021, Tuesday to Friday 12:30am to 1:30am) (Drama repeated on 9 April 2022, Weekends 5:00pm to 6:00pm)
 Big White Duel / Big White Duel (9 December) (Drama repeated on 19 April 2021, Weekdays 1:00pm to 2:00pm)

2021
 The Defected / The Defected (13 January) (Drama repeated on 19 August 2021, Weekdays 1:00pm to 2:00pm)
 Our Unwinding Ethos / Our Unwinding Ethos (26 February) (Drama repeated on 30 September 2021, Weekdays 1:00pm to 2:00pm)
Airport Strikers (2 April) (Sponsored by Kinohimitsu) (Drama repeated on 4 November 2021, Weekdays 1:00pm to 2:00pm)
 Forensic Heroes IV / Forensic Heroes IV (7 May) (Drama repeated on 9 December 2021, Weekdays 1:00pm to 2:00pm)
 Flying Tiger 2 / Flying Tiger II (18 June) (Sponsored by GlaxoSmithKline Malaysia - Sensodyne) (Drama repeated on 20 January 2022, Weekdays 1:00pm to 2:00pm)
 The Exorcist's 2nd Meter / The Exorcist's 2nd Meter (30 July) (Drama repeated on 10 March 2022, Weekdays 1:00pm to 2:00pm) (Broadcast suspended on 4 April 2022 for The 2022 64th Annual Grammy Awards)
 Al Cappuccino / Al Cappuccino (3 September) (Sponsored by GlaxoSmithKline Malaysia - Parodontax)
The Witness (15 October) (Sponsored by GlaxoSmithKline Malaysia - Sensodyne)
 Line Walker: Bull Fight / Line Walker: Bull Fight (12 November)

2022
 Armed Reaction 2021 (4 January)
 Beauty And The Boss (22 February)
 Sinister Beings / Sinister Beings (5 April) (Sponsored by GlaxoSmithKline Malaysia - Sensodyne)

These series are produced by Hong Kong's Television Broadcasts Ltd. The timeslot is set at 7:00pm to 8:00pm Saturday and Sunday.

2018
 Blue Veins (9 June) (1st Weekend drama, originally planned for broadcast on NTV7)
 Law dis-Order / Law dis-Order (30 September)

2019
 Tiger Mom Blues / Tiger Mom Blues (6 January)
Destination Nowhere (17 March)
Oh My Grad (30 June)
 Heart of Greed 3 / Heart and Greed 3 (13 October)

2020
Daddy Cool (8 March)
Flying Tiger (11 July)
 Succession War / Succession War (24 October) (Sponsored by Nestlé Malaysia - Milo Malaysia)

2021
The Learning Curve of a Warlord (30 January) (Sponsored by GlaxoSmithKline Malaysia - Sensodyne)
 Of Greed and Ants / Of Greed And Ants (16 May)
The Dripping Sauce (29 August)
 Brutally Young / Brutally Young (12 December)

TVB Weekend
This is a new segment from 2022 onwards, which broadcast series from Hong Kong's Television Broadcasts Ltd. The drama timeslot for this segment is set at Weekends 7:00pm to 8:00pm.

2022
 Life After Death (TV series) / Life After Death (20 February)

Best Of The East (Chinese and formerly Korean drama series)
These series are produced by Chinese TV studios (mostly mainland), South Korean TV studios (known as Korean drama), and Taiwanese studios; their drama broadcast timeslot is set at 8:30pm to 9:30pm from Monday to Thursday (Friday included since 2019). These series also include the overlapping of Hito Theatre. These series also includes Primori 8 segment which are 8TV Chinese local drama series. Due to 8TV Mandarin News broadcast time changes, the timeslot was adjusted starting from the week of 8 June 2020 onwards, which is from 9:00pm to 10:00pm. During the same week, the drama broadcast days change again which is from every Monday to Thursday.
http://8tv-addicted.blogspot.com/p/list-of-korean-dramas-for-2015.html

 The 1st Shop of Coffee Prince
 The Abandoned Secrets
 Big
 Bull Fighting
 Faith
 Flaming Butterfly
 The Fugitive: Plan B
 Full House
 Get Karl! Oh Soo-jung
 Ghost Catcher 2
 Glory Jane
 Gourmet
 The Greatest Love
 Green Rose
 Heaven Dragon
 The Hospital
 Iljimae
 In Love With Power
 King of Baking, Kim Takgu
 Legend of Fang De and Miao Cui Hua
 The Legend of Great Chinese Surgeon-Huo Tuo 
 Legend of Speed
 Loving You
 Miss No Good
 Miss Ripley
 My Girlfriend Is a Nine-Tailed Fox
 My Princess
 Night After Night 
 One Mom and Three Dads
 Paladins in Troubled Times
 Personal Taste
 Princess Hours
 Secret Garden
 Snow Angel
 Stairway to Heaven
 Storm Rider II
 Summer Scent
 Time Between Dog and Wolf 
 Why Why Love
 Wonderful Life

2004
 Jewel in the Palace / Dae Jang Geum (End of December) (Replayed in 2005)

2008
 The Legend of Bruce Lee / The Legend of Bruce Lee (26 October)

2009
 Beethoven Virus / Beethoven Virus (5 October) (Weekdays 8:30pm to 9:30pm)
 Easy Fortune Happy Life / Easy Fortune Happy Life (9 November)
 Boys Over Flowers / Boys Over Flowers (16 December)

2010
 Pandamen / Pandamen (2 February)
 The Heaven Sword and Dragon Saber / The Heaven Sword and Dragon Saber (17 March)
 Brilliant Legacy / Brilliant Legacy (12 May)
 My Fair Lady / My Fair Lady (5 July)
 Journey to the West (2010) / Journey to the West (9 August)
 Style / Style (15 October)
 Oh! My Lady / Oh! My Lady (16 November)
 You're Beautiful / You're Beautiful (14 December)

2011
A Time To Embrace (13 January) (Local drama series)
 All Men Are Brothers / All Men Are Brothers (1 March)

2012
 Can't Lose / Hate to Lose (12 November)

2013
 City Hunter / City Hunter (10 January)
 Protect the Boss / Protect the Boss (1 February)
 Moon Embracing the Sun / Moon Embracing the Sun (28 March)
 Swordsman / Swordsman (7 May)
 The Legend of Kublai Khan (11 September)
 The Innocent Man The Innocent Man (20 November)
 Rooftop Prince(Date Unknown)

2014
 The Stand-In The Stand-In (7 May)
 Palace 3: The Lost Daughter / The Palace: the Lost Daughter (30 September)
 Nine: Nine Time Travels / Nine: Nine Time Travels (1 December)
 The Good Doctor / The Good Doctor (29 December)

2015
 The Inheritors / The Heirs (5 February)
 My Love From the Stars / My Love from the Star (18 March)
 The Romance of the Condor Heroes / The Romance of the Condor Heroes (24 April)
 Flying Swords of Dragon Gate (2014) / Flying Swords of Dragon Gate (7 July)
Half for the People, Half for Beauties / Empyrean Doctor (1 September)
 The Deer and the Cauldron / The Deer and the Cauldron (6 November)
 Reply 1997 (7 May)
 The 3rd Hospital (9 November)
 What Happens to My Family? (24 December)

2016
The Cage of Love (15 January)
The Female Assassins in the Palace (9 March)
 Legend of Ban Shu / Ban Shu Legend (11 May)
The Eleventh Son (11 July)
The Classic of Mountains and Seas (21 September)
New Edge City Wanderer (5 December)

2017
 The Princess Weiyoung / The Princess Weiyoung (21 February)
 General and I / General and I (8 May)
 Fighter of the Destiny / Fighter of the Destiny (2 August)
Princess of Lanling King (17 October)

2018
 The King's Woman / The King's Woman (5 January) (Drama suspended on 15 February 2018, 16 February 2018)
Chronicle of a Taichi Master (16 March)
 Siege in Fog / Siege in Fog (14 May)
The Great Shaolin (23 July, moved to Saturday 3pm to 5pm, 2 episodes back to back)
 Martial Universe / Martial Universe (3 September) (Drama repeated on 7 October 2021, Tuesday to Friday 12:30am to 1:30am)
 Ashes of Love / Ashes of Love (26 November) (Sponsored by Naturel oil) (Drama repeated on 8 March 2021, Monday 11:00 pm to Tuesday 12:30 am and Tuesday 11:00 pm to Wednesday 12:30 am)

2019
 Secret of the Three Kingdoms / Secret of the Three Kingdoms (26 February)
 The Legends (TV series) / Zhao Yao (14 May) (Drama repeated on 25 August 2020, Weekdays 10:30am to 11:30am) (Drama repeated on 5 January 2022, Wednesday 11:00 pm to Thursday 12:30am and Thursday 11:00pm to Friday 12:30am) (Timeslot change from 6 April 2022 onwards to 7 April 2022, Thursday 12:00am to 1:30am and Friday 12:00am to 1:30am)
 The Destiny of White Snake / The Destiny Of White Snake (30 July) (Drama repeated on 16 November 2020, Monday 11:00 pm to Tuesday 12:30 am and Tuesday 11:00 pm to Wednesday 12:30 am) (Timeslot on 18 January, 25 January Monday 11:30pm to Tuesday 1:00am)
 Legend of the Phoenix / Legend of The Phoenix (23 October) (Drama repeated on 11 January 2022, Monday 11:00pm to Tuesday 12:30am and Tuesday 11:00pm to Wednesday 12:30am)
 Young Blood (TV series) / Young Blood (19 December) (Drama repeated on 28 December 2021, Weekdays 6:00pm to 7:00pm)

2020
 Ming Dynasty (2019 TV series) / Ming Dynasty (19 February) (Drama repeated on 28 September 2021, Monday 11:00pm to Tuesday 12:30am and Tuesday 11:00pm to Wednesday 12:30am) (Timeslot for first episode on 28 September 2021 from 11:50pm to 12:30am)  
 Joy of Life (TV series) / Joy of Life (15 May) (Drama repeated on 18 March 2021, Wednesday 11:00pm to Thursday 12:30am and Thursday 11:00 pm to Friday 12:30am) (Timeslot for first episode on 18 March 2021 from 11:50pm to 12:30am)
Shimmering Fireworks (29 July) (Local drama series) (Drama repeated on 20 November 2021, Saturday 5:00pm to 6:00pm) (Timeslot on 19 December 2021 onwards, Weekends 5:00pm to 6:00pm)
 Princess Silver / Princess Silver (2 September) (Drama repeated on 9 June 2021, Wednesday 11:00pm to Thursday 12:30am and Thursday 11:00pm to Friday 12:30am)
 The Romance of Tiger and Rose / The Romance of Tiger and Rose (14 December) (Drama repeated on 23 November 2021, Weekdays 6:00pm to 7:00pm) (Drama repeated on 3 April 2022, Sunday 12:00am to 2:00am) (Timeslot change on 1 May 2022 onwards, Sunday 1:00am to 2:30am)  (2 episodes back to back)

2021
A Promise To Love (25 January) (Local drama series) (Drama repeated on 2 January 2022, Weekends 10:30am to 11:30am)
Heroic Journey of Ne Zha (15 February) (Sponsored by GlaxoSmithKline Malaysia - Sensodyne) (*Last few episodes*) (Drama repeated on 8 April 2022, Friday 11:30am to Saturday 1:30am) (2 episodes back to back)
 Love in Between (TV series) / Love in Between (5 May) (Drama repeated on 5 April 2022, Monday 11:00pm to Tuesday 12:30am and Tuesday 11:00pm to Wednesday 12:30am)
Weaving a Tale of Love (20 July)
 Love and Redemption / Love and Redemption (28 September) (Sponsored by Ginvera) (Episode 39 onwards/6 December)

2022
 Gong Xi Fa Cai (2022 Chinese New Year's local drama series) (Sponsored by GlaxoSmithKline Malaysia - Caltrate 600 Plus, Nivea Malaysia - Whitening Deep Serum Hokkaido Rose, 10 Super Vitamins & Skin Foods, etc...) (12 January 2022)
 Express Happiness (2022 Chinese New Year's local short drama series) (7 January 2022) (Friday and Saturday 9:00pm to 9:30pm) (Drama repeated on 26 March 2022, Saturday 11:00pm to 11:30pm and Saturday 11:30pm to Sunday 12:00am) (2 episodes back to back)
 The Long Ballad / The Long Ballad (7 February)
 Novoland: Pearl Eclipse / Novoland: Pearl Eclipse (3 May)

These series are produced by local and foreign Chinese TV studios; the timeslot is usually set at 9:30pm to 10:30pm from Monday to Thursday. Due to 8TV Mandarin News broadcast time changes, the timeslot was adjusted starting from the week of 8 June 2020 onwards, which is from 10:00pm to 11:00pm.

2018
Dr. Chen's Diary (1 January) (Local drama series)
Singing in the Spring (5 February) (Local drama series) (Final Episode on Chinese New Year's Eve, on 8:30pm to 9:30pm)
All Under One Roof (19 February) (Local drama series)
 Doppelganger (TV series) / Doppelganger (3 April)
Persona II (10 May) (Local drama series)
 Mightiest Mother-in-Law / Mightiest Mother-in-Law (14 June)
My Sensei Nyonya (26 July) (Local drama series) (Drama repeated on 23 February 2021, Weekdays 6:00 pm to 7:00 pm)
 My Friends from Afar / My Friends-From-Afar (9 October)
Super Mischievous MIL (21 November) (Local drama series) (Drama repeated on 7 April 2021, Weekdays 6:00 pm to 7:00 pm)
Till We Meet Again (26 December) (From 1 January onwards: Weekdays)

2019
Sweet Delicacy (24 January) (Local drama series)
Hello From the Other Side (11 March)
 How Are You? (TV series) / How are you? (15 April)
The Promise (13 May) (Local drama series)
PTU (26 June) (Also available at ViuTV) (Drama repeated on 5 January 2021, Tuesday to Friday 12:30am to 1:30am) (Timeslot on 19 January, 26 January 1:00am to 2:00am)
Turning Point 2 (19 August) (Local drama series) (sequel of The Turning Point) (Drama repeated on 26 June 2021, Weekends 9:30am to 10:30am)
All Is Well (2 October) (1 episode consists of 2 parts, part 1 from Taiwan scene, part 2 from Singapore scene) (Drama repeated on 7 September 2020, Monday 11:00 pm to Tuesday 12:30 am and Tuesday 11:00 pm to Wednesday 12:30 am)
Blessings 2 (11 December)

2020
Singing In The Spring 2020 (15 January) (Local drama series) (Drama repeated on 30 January 2022, Monday 12:30am to 2:00am)
After The Stars (3 February)
Coolie (11 March) (Taiwan drama series) (Drama repeated on 24 May 2021, Weekdays 1:00pm to 2:00pm)
I Court You (4 May) (Local drama series) (Drama repeated on 19 September 2021, Weekends 9:30am to 10:30am)
While You Were Away (24 June)
 C.L.I.F. 5 (29 July) (Drama repeated on 5 June 2021) (Timeslot on 5 June from 4:00pm to 5:00pm), (Timeslot on 12 June onwards, 3:00pm to 5:00pm)
My One In A Million (2 September) (Drama repeated on 14 August 2021) (Saturday 3:00pm to 5:00pm) (Timeslot on 14 August from 4:00pm to 5:00pm), (Timeslot on 21 August onwards, 3:00pm to 5:00pm)
Daybreak (15 October)
 Dear Neighbours (19 November)
 The Good Fight (29 December)

2021
Hello, My Little Fortune (8 January) (Local drama series) (Friday 9:00pm to 9:30pm) (Seasonal local drama series)
Happy Prince (2 February) (Timeslot on 8 February 2021, 10:30pm to 11:30pm), (Timeslot on 9 February 2021 to 11 February 2021, return to normal hours), (Timeslot on 15 February 2021, return to normal hours), (Timeslot on 3 March 2021 onwards, drama broadcast Wednesday and Thursday at normal hours)
Invisible Life (Wednesday and Thursday) (25 March) (Drama repeated on 13 April 2022, Tuesday 12:30am to 1:30am, Wednesday 12:30am to 1:30am, Thursday 1:30am to 2:30am, Friday 1:30am to 2:30am, Saturday 1:00am to 2:00am)
You're My Destiny (Wednesday until Friday) (18 August) (Local drama series)
 My Best Friend's Story / My Best Friend's Story (16 September)

2022
 A Quest to Heal / A Quest To Heal (9 February) (Drama broadcast under new segment, Drama@10)

Best Of The East K
Starting 1 April 2016, the Korean drama broadcast timeslot is broadcast separately at 9:30pm, instead of 8:30pm from Monday to Thursday, currently moved to the timeslot at 10:30pm and Every Saturday and Sunday from 6:30pm to 8:00pm. Unless stated, the series here are all in original language. Since 2018, the Korean drama retain the broadcast timeslot at 10.30pm to 11.30pm. One of the Korean drama broadcast on Monday and Tuesday, while the other Korean drama broadcast on Wednesday and Thursday. Although rare, the day of broadcast may be adjust to broadcast either one of the two Korean drama when there is no new Korean drama available after the Korean drama series was finished, thus overwriting the current slot. The timeslot may also be used to broadcast other drama series (e.g.: Singapore and Thai drama series). Due to 8TV Mandarin News broadcast time changes, the timeslot was adjusted starting from the week of 8 June 2020 onwards, which is from 11:00pm to 12:00am. Korean drama series cease broadcasting from 7 July 2020, and completely migrated to TV3 on 10 August 2020 without Chinese subtitles. Korean drama series resume under Best Of The East K segment on 1 March 2021, where the broadcast timeslot 10:00pm to 11:00pm. Best Of The East K segment broadcast on Monday and Tuesday and may broadcast as an interim on Wednesday and Thursday at 10:00pm to 11:00pm timeslot. Starting from the week of 4 April 2022, Best Of The East K segment broadcast only on Monday and Tuesday, due to Drama@10 new segment occupy on Wednesday and Thursday.

 Date listed for dramas are of debut date unless stated otherwise.

2016
 Pinocchio / Pinocchio (1 April) (Mandarin dub)
 Super Daddy Yeol / Super Daddy Yul (6 May) (Mandarin dub)
 Oh My Ghostess / Oh My Ghost (6 June) (Mandarin dub)
 Descendants of the Sun / Descendants Of The Sun (9 June)
 Oh My Venus / Oh My Venus (25 July) (Mandarin dub)
 Hey Ghost, Let's Fight / Hey Ghost, Let's Fight (25 August)
 Cheese in the Trap / Cheese in the Trap (12 September) (Mandarin dub) (Sponsored by KFC Malaysia)
 Another Miss Oh / Another Oh Hae-young (1 November)
 Love in the Moonlight / Love in the Moonlight (10 November)

2017
 The K2 / The K2 (2 January)
 Cinderella and Four Knights / Cinderella and Four Knights (3 February) 
 Woman with a Suitcase / Women with a Suitcase (22 February)
 Tomorrow With You / Tomorrow With You (21 April)
 Hwarang: The Poet Warrior Youth / Hwarang: The Poet Warrior Youth (18 April) 
 Chicago Typewriter / Chicago Typewriter (14 June)
 Introverted Boss / Introverted Boss (6 July)
 Circle: Two Worlds Connected / Circle (21 August)
 Goblin / Goblin (2 October)
 Revolutionary Love / Revolutionary Love (13 November)
 Fight for My Way / Fight For My Way (15 November)
 Andante / Andante (24 September)

2018
 Criminal Minds (South Korea) / Criminal Minds (South Korea) (29 January)
 Cross / Cross (20 March)
 A Poem a Day / A Poem A Day (26 April) (rescheduled for Saturday on 12 May)
 Suits / Suits (7 May)
 Lawless Lawyer / Lawless Layer (16 May) 
 Strong Girl Bong-soon / Strong Woman Do Bong-soon (2 July)
 A Korean Odyssey / A Korean Odyssey (2 August)
 100 Days My Prince / 100 Days My Prince (18 September)
 Mama Fairy and the Woodcutter / Tale of Fairy (22 November)
 Encounter / Encounter (10 December)

2019
 The Crowned Clown / The Crowned Clown (20 February)
 He Is Psychometric / He Is Psychometric (18 March)
 The Light in Your Eyes (TV series)  / Dazzling (1 May)
 What's Wrong with Secretary Kim / What's Wrong with Secretary Kim (10 June)
 Angel's Last Mission: Love / Angel's Last Mission: Love (3 July)
 At Eighteen / At Eighteen (2 September)
 Flower Crew: Joseon Marriage Agency / Flower Crew: Joseon Marriage Agency (26 November)

2020
 Touch Your Heart / Touch Your Heart (24 February)
 A Piece of Your Mind / A Piece of Your Mind (12 May)

2021
 Dr. Romantic 2 / Dr. Romantic 2 (1 March) (Monday and Tuesday) (Return of Korean drama series under Best Of The East K segment) (Sponsored by Abbott Laboratories - Similac Malaysia - Gain Plus Gold)
 Find Me in Your Memory / Find Me in Your Memory (17 May) (Sponsored by Abbott Laboratories - Similac Malaysia - Gain Plus Gold)
 The World of the Married / The World of the Married (2 August) (Sponsored by Abbott Laboratories - Similac Malaysia - Gain Plus Gold)
 Special Labor Inspector / Special Labor Inspector Mr.Jo (18 October) (Sponsored by Abbott Laboratories - Similac Malaysia - Gain Plus Gold)

2022
 Police University / Police University (3 January) (Sponsored by GlaxoSmithKline Malaysia - Sensodyne)
 Alice (South Korean TV series) / Alice (29 March) (Drama suspended on 2 May 2022 and 3 May 2022 for movies due to seasonal Hari Raya Aidilfitri festival) (Sponsored by Abbott Laboratories - Similac Malaysia - Gain Plus Gold)

Best Of The East T
These series are produced by Thailand, it has replace English slot on Thursday in 2017. The segment target audience are Malay viewers and the timeslot given is after 8TV Express. Starting 23 February 2018, the segment timeslot had been changed to Friday at 11.30pm and available on original Thai language. Due to 8TV Mandarin News broadcast time changes, the timeslot was adjusted starting from the week of 8 June 2020 onwards, which is from 11:00pm to 12:00pm.

Flower Ring (Original language)
Game Maya (Dubbed in Mandarin)
 You Are My Destiny / Fated To Love You (Dubbed in Mandarin)

2018
I See You (24 August) (Original language)
 Pure Intention (1 December) (Original language)

2020
 In Time with You (26 February) (Original language) (Drama repeated on 19 October 2020, Tuesday to Friday 12:30am to 1:30am) (Drama repeated on 6 November 2021, Saturday 12:30am to 1:30am) (2 episodes back to back)
 My Ambulance (20 May) (Original language) (Drama repeated on 30 November 2020, Tuesday to Friday 12:30am to 1:30am) (Drama repeated on 12 February 2022, Saturday 12:30am to 2:30am) (2 episodes back to back)

2021
 My Love From Another Star (Original language) (moved to Awesome TV)

Drama@10
This is a new segment from 6 April 2022 onwards, which broadcast series from Singapore. Drama broadcast are 2 episodes back to back. The drama timeslot for these segment is set at 
Wednesday 10:00pm to Thursday 12:00am and Thursday 10:00pm to Friday 12:00am.

2022
 A Quest to Heal / A Quest To Heal (9 February)
My Star Bride (5 May)

Dramedy
This segment which begin from 14 May 2019 onwards, broadcast local and international drama series (mainly from China and Singapore studios). The drama timeslot for these segment is set at Weekdays 6:00pm to 7:00pm.

2019
 Babies On Board (14 May)
 Say Cheese (TV series) (13 June)
Pushing Hands (11 July)
Cosmetology High (16 September)
Heart to Heart (29 October)
How Are You? (3 December)

2020
Walk With Me (30 January)
Rebirth of Shopping Addict (5 March)
Blessings 2 (5 May) (Repeated drama)
Wait in Beijing (3 June) (Weekdays 6:00pm to 7:00pm) (Drama suspended on 3 August 2020 due to Oppo Reno 4 Promotion Conference) (Drama repeated on 25 May 2021, Tuesday to Friday 12:30am to 1:30am)

2021
My Sensei Nyonya (23 February) (Local drama series)
Super Mischievous MIL (7 April) (Local drama series)
The Centimeter of Love (5 May) (Weekdays 6:00pm to 7:00pm) (Drama repeated on 20 January 2022, Tuesday to Friday 12:30am to 1:30am) (Timeslot on 7 April 2022 and 8 April 2022, Thursday 1:30am to 2:30am and Friday 1:30am to 2:30am, Timeslot on 9 April 2022, Saturday 1:00 am to 2:00am, Timeslot on 12 April 2022 (Final episode), Tuesday 12:30am to 1:30am)
Loving You (6 July) (Weekdays 6:00pm to 7:00pm)
 Palace: the Lock Heart Jade / Palace (3 August) (Drama repeated on 27 February 2022, Weekends 9:30am to 10:30am)
 Love Yunge from the Desert / Love Yunge from the Desert (21 September)
 The Romance of Tiger and Rose / The Romance of Tiger and Rose (23 November) (Drama repeated on 3 April 2022, Sunday 12:00am to 2:00am) (Timeslot change on 1 May 2022 onwards, Sunday 1:00am to 2:30am) (2 episodes back to back)
 Young Blood (TV series) / Young Blood (28 December)

2022
My Guardian Angels (7 March)
Hand In Hand (18 April)

Drama O'Clock (Series imported from Singapore)
This segment which begin from 20 November 2021 onwards, broadcast drama series from Singapore. The drama timeslot for these segment is set at Weekends 3:00pm to 5:00pm.

2021
Old Is Gold (20 November 2021) (Saturday 3:00pm to 5:00pm) (4 episodes back to back) (Repeat broadcast on 4 April 2022, 8:00am to 8:30am)

Hito Idol Theatre (Korean and Taiwanese drama series)
These are programmes made by Korean and Taiwanese studios. The drama timeslot for these segment is set at Saturday 6:30pm to 8:00pm.

 Apple in Your Eye
 Calling For Love
 Down with Love
 Dream High
Lightning
 Love Rain
 Mary Stayed Out All Night
 Momo Love
 Pandamen
 Playful Kiss
 Queen In-hyun's Man
 Skip Beat!
 Sunny Girl
 Tamra, the Island
 The King 2 Hearts (Taiwanese Mandarin dub)
 The Strongest K-Pop Survival
 The World That They Live In
 ToGetHer
 Volleyball Lover
You Coloured My World

2014
 That Winter, the Wind Blows (8 November)

2015
 Monstar (14 March)
 I Can Hear Your Voice (20 June)
 Flower Boys Next Door (3 September)
 Blade Man (20 October)

2016
 Hi! School – Love On / Hi! School – Love On (27 February)
 Reply 1988 / Reply 1988 (16 July)

2017
Promise of Migratory Birds (4 February) (Saturday 6:00pm to 8:00pm) (2 Episodes back to back.)
 The Gentlemen of Wolgyesu Tailor Shop / The Gentlemen of Wolgyesu Tailor Shop (22 April) (Timeslot broadcast on 12 May onwards, broadcast  7:00pm to 8:00pm)

2018
To Love To Heal (22 April) (Sunday 4:00pm to 5:00pm)
Excellent Investor (1 July) (Saturday and Sunday 3:00pm to 5:00pm) (Timeslot broadcast on 1 July onwards, 4:00pm to 5:00pm) (Timeslot broadcast on 2 September onwards, 3:00pm to 5:00pm) (Drama suspended on 16 September 2018 due to Malaysia Day programmes.) (Drama finished on 23 September) (Drama repeated on 30 December 2020, Wednesday 11:00 pm to Thursday 12:30 am and Thursday 11:00 pm to Friday 12:30 am)
Meet In Youth Love In Foods (30 September) (Sunday 3:00pm to 5:00pm) (2 episodes back to back) (Timeslot broadcast on 20 October 2018 onwards, broadcast on Weekends) (Drama repeated on 7 May 2020)

International Programmes
These programmes were broadcast during the 8TV Urban period which is usually at night, especially midnight or early in the morning. Although the last remaining English programme concluded its broadcast on 9 February 2018, the English programmes were eventually migrated on 5 March 2018 to NTV7.

 10 Things I Hate About You
 The 100
 2 Broke Girls
 24
 8 Simple Rules
 Action Zone
 Alias
 American Chopper
 American Idol (Reality Television - Sing Talent Search Competition Show)
 America's Got Talent (Reality Television - Talent Search Competition Show)
 America's Next Top Model (Reality Television - Modelling Talent Search Competition Show)
 The Apprentice (Reality Television - Job Search Competition Show)
 Arrested Development
 Ashley Banjo's Secret Street Crew
 The Bachelor (Reality Television - Dating Based Competition Show)
 The Bachelorette (Reality Television - Dating Based Competition Show)
 Battleground Earth
 Battlestar Galactica
 Baywatch
 The Biggest Loser
 The Buried Life
 Burn Notice
 Brooklyn Nine-Nine
 Caramba!
 Catfish: The TV Show
 The Colony
 Commander in Chief
 Criminal Minds
 Criminal Minds: Beyond Borders
 CSI: Crime Scene Investigation
 CSI: NY
 Castle (Also aired on Fox (Asia))
 Cupid
 Desperate Housewives
 Dirty Sexy Money (season 1, season 2 is shown on NTV7)
 Distraction
 Don't Trust the B---- in Apartment 23
 Eve
 Everybody Hates Chris
 Extreme Makeover
 Fastlane
 Flash Prank
 Friends (moved from NTV7, but returned to NTV7 in the final season)
 Ghost Whisperer
 Gilmore Girls (season 2 onwards)
 The Goldbergs
 Goodwin Games
 Gossip Girl
 Hannah Montana
 Hero to Zero
 Hole in the Wall
 I Survived a Japanese Game Show (Reality Television - Game Show)
 Invasion
 iZombie
 Jamie Oliver's Food Revolution
 Jane by Design
 The Janice Dickinson Modeling Agency (Reality Television - Modelling Talent Search Competition Show)
 Joey
 Kenny vs. Spenny
 Kevin Hill
 Kimora: Life in the Fab Lane (Reality Television)
 Las Vegas
 LAX
 Less than Perfect
 Lost
 Make Me a Supermodel (Reality Television - Modelling Talent Search Competition Show)
 Making the Band
 Mixology
 Mobbed
 My Babysitter's a Vampire
 My Big Fat Obnoxious Boss
 Navy 6
 NCIS
NCIS: Los Angeles
 Nip/Tuck
 Nitro Circus
 The O.C.
 Oblivious
 Oliver Twist
 Once Upon a Time (last broadcast on 9 February 2018)
 One Tree Hill
 Overhaulin' (Reality Television)
 Pretty Little Liars
 Prison Break
 Paris Hilton's My New BFF
 Project Accessory
 Project Runway (Reality Television - Fashion Design Talent Search Competition Show)
 Punk'd
 Pushing Daisies
 Queer Eye For the Straight Guy
 Reaper
 The Restaurant
 Revenge
 Rooftop Room Cat
 Scrubs
 Selena Gomez
 South Park (moved from TV9, but returned to TV9 in February 2010)
 The Simple Life
 So You Think You Can Dance (Reality Television - Dance Talent Search Competition Show)
 Stacked
 The Swan
 Switched at Birth
 Terminator: The Sarah Connor Chronicles
 The Tomorrow People
 TV Champion
 Twisted
 Ugly Betty (the final season was not broadcast)
 The Vampire Diaries
 Vanished
 What If
 Who Wants to Be a Superhero?
 Wipeout USA (Reality Television - Game Show)
 Will & Grace
 The X Factor (Reality Television - Sing Talent Search Competition Show)
 Zero Hour

Live and Delayed Telecasts
These programmes were broadcast live or delayed, they are mainly local and international programmes. These programmes consists of daily news, talkshows, sports, musical/entertainment awards, festive celebration, latest happenings in the entertainment industry and many more.

 8TV Express Live
 8TV Express
 8TV Nite Live
 Living Delight x Wow Shop  (2021–present) (Weekdays 3:00pm to 3:30pm) (Broadcast suspended on 4 April 2022 for The 2022 64th Annual Grammy Awards)

2004
 8 E-News (8 January - present) (Daily broadcast on Weekdays) (formerly known as 8 E-Channel)
 8TV Mandarin News (8 January - present) (Daily broadcast)
 The 8TV Quickie (8 January - 31 March 2016) (Daily broadcast) (replaced by 8TV Express)
 UEFA Euro 2004 (13 June to 5 July) (Repeat Matches) (Reality Television)

2009
 Shout! Awards  (17 July) (Friday 8:30pm to 11:30pm) (1st Edition) (Reality Television - Entertainment Awards Show)

2010
 Shout! Awards  (20 November) (Saturday 8:30pm onwards) (2nd Edition) (Reality Television - Entertainment Awards Show)

2011
 Mnet Asian Music Awards (29 November) (Tuesday 9:30pm to Wednesday 1:30am) (Reality Television - Music Awards Show)

2012
 Shout! Awards (23 November) (Friday 8:30pm onwards) (3rd Edition) (Reality Television - Entertainment Awards Show)

2013
 Shout! Awards  (9 November) (Saturday 8:30pm onwards) (4th Edition) (Reality Television - Entertainment Awards Show)

2014
 Mnet Asian Music Awards (3 December) (Delayed telecast from Wednesday 9:30pm to Thursday 1:30am) (Reality Television - Music Awards Show)

2015
 CCTV New Year's Gala delayed telecast) (CCTV-4 Asia version) (Reality Television)
 Mnet Asian Music Awards (2 December) (Live from Wednesday 5:00pm to 7:00pm for Red Carpet Ceremony and 7:00pm to 10:30pm for Awards Show Ceremony via Tonton website) (Delayed telecast from Wednesday 10:00pm to Thursday 1:30am) (Reality Television - Music Awards Show) 

2018
Living Delight (1 January - present) (Weekdays 2:00pm to 3:00pm) (Programme migrated from NTV7) (Broadcast suspended on 4 April 2022 for The 2022 64th Annual Grammy Awards)
 8TV Global Watch (30 April - 31 December 2019) (Reality Television - Current Affairs) (Last broadcast by NTV7 on 2 March 2018 before migrating to 8TV)

2020
 Money Matters (4 September) (Sponsored by Abbott Laboratories - Ensure Malaysia - Ensure Gold) (Reality Television - Current Affairs) 

2021
 Shopee Fortune Box (18 January - 8 February) (Reality Television)
 Money Matters (Season Two) (5 March) (Reality Television - Current Affairs)
 Miss Malaysia Tourism Pageant 2021 (1 May) (Reality Television)
 Money Matters (Season Three) (20 August) (Reality Television - Current Affairs)
 Pre-Budget Talk Show (29 October) (Reality Television)
 Budget 2022 (29 October) (Reality Television)
 Miss Tourism International 2021/22 (19 December) (Reality Television)

2022
 8 E-News 2022 (Weekdays 5:30pm to 6:00pm)
 8TV 18th Anniversary Bonanza (8 January) (Saturday 9:30pm to 11:30pm) (Sponsored by Abbott Laboratories - Ensure Malaysia - Ensure Gold) (Reality Television)
 CCTV Spring Festival Gala 2022 (31 January) (Monday 11:00pm to Tuesday 2:00am) delayed telecast (Reality Television)
 2022 JSBC Lantern Festival Gala (15 February) (Tuesday 11:00pm to Wednesday 12:30am) delayed telecast (Reality Television)
 Shall We Talk (1 April) (Friday 10:30pm to 11:30pm) (Reality Television - Current Affairs) (Repeat broadcast on 5 April 2022, Tuesday 7:00am to 8:00am)
 The 2022 64th Annual Grammy Awards (4 April) (Live from Monday 8:00am onwards via Tonton website) (Delayed telecast from Monday 1:00pm to 3:30pm) (Reality Television - Music Awards Show)
 8TV Morning Express (8 April) (Weekdays 9:30am to 9:45am)

Online Programming
 8FM @ 8TV  (Broadcast as 8FM since 3 August 2021 after rebranding exercise announced on the previous day) (Formerly broadcast as One FM since 10 May 2021) (Monday 2:00am to 7:00am) (Tuesday to Friday 1:30am to 7:00am) (Saturday and Sunday 2:30am to 7:00am) (Timeslot change from 7 April 2022 onwards, Monday 2:00am to 7:00am, Tuesday and Wednesday 1:30am to 7:00am, Thursday and Friday 2:30am to 7:00am, Weekends 2:00am to 7:00am) (Timeslot change from 1st June 2023 onwards, Everyday 12:00 midnight to 7:00am)

References

8TV
8tv Programmes